Kürsat Güclü (born 13 May 1994) is an Austrian-Turkish football player. He plays for SV Stripfing.

Club career
He made his Austrian Football First League debut for SC Austria Lustenau on 21 July 2017 in a game against Floridsdorfer AC.

References

External links
 

1994 births
Austrian people of Turkish descent
Footballers from Vienna
Living people
Turkish footballers
Austrian footballers
Wiener Sport-Club players
First Vienna FC players
SC Austria Lustenau players
FC Mauerwerk players
2. Liga (Austria) players
Austrian Regionalliga players
Association football midfielders